Bill Amick (November 16, 1925 – July 15, 1995) was a NASCAR Grand National Series and West Coast driver from Portland, Oregon. He has one win, nineteen top-fives, twenty-seven top 10s, and five poles in Grand National.

Driving career
After racing in the NASCAR Pacific Coast Late Model Series, Amick jumped to the Grand National Series in 1954 and ran six races. Two years later, he was able to finish seventeenth in the standings. He improved that in 1957, to sixteenth place. That year, he also won his first and only race at the Capital Speedway in Sacramento, California. That was his highest point finish in his NASCAR Grand National Career. He only raced Grand National part-time because he wanted to focus on the Pacific Coast Late Models in which he finished second in the standings in 1964 and won the championship a year later. After a brief stint of running in the Can-Am Series, Amick retired and started working with NASCAR speedways.

Personal life
Brother of George Amick. Despite sharing the same first name, he was not the father of Lyndon Amick. They are not related. Lyndon Amick hails from South Carolina, while Bill and George Amick were from Vernonia, Oregon.

Awards
Amick was inducted in the West Coast Stock Car Hall of Fame in its first class (2002).

References

Racer Profile

1925 births
1995 deaths
NASCAR drivers
Racing drivers from Portland, Oregon
Place of birth missing
Place of death missing